The 49th Parallel Cup (formerly PanAm Cup) is an annual representative Australian rules football match between the United States and Canada first contested in 1999. Since 2007 the women's teams have also contested the cup.

The men's matches are contested between the United States men's team ("The Revolution") and Canada's men's team ("The Northwind") while the women's matches are contested between the United States women's team ("The Freedom") and Canada's women's team ("The Northern Lights").

The cup is historically paused during the Australian Football International Cup year to enable the countries to compete at that tournament. Between 2015 and 2021 the cup went into recess for several reasons, primarily due to the 2017 Australian Football International Cup followed by the COVID-19 pandemic.

Men's results

Women's results

References

Australian rules football in North America
International Australian rules football tournaments